Julius Engelhard (18 July 1883 – 13 December 1964) was a German painter. His work was part of the art competitions at the 1932 Summer Olympics and the 1936 Summer Olympics.

References

1883 births
1964 deaths
20th-century German painters
20th-century German male artists
German male painters
Olympic competitors in art competitions
People from Binjai
Expatriates from Germany in the Dutch East Indies